Capes or CAPES may refer to:


People
 Adrian Capes (1873–1955), English footballer
 Arthur Capes (1875–1945), English footballer
 Bernard Capes (1854–1918), English author
 Geoff Capes (born 1949), British strongman and shot putter
 Jack Capes (1898–1933), English hockey player and cricketer
 Peter Capes (born 1962), Australian businessman and former cricketer

CAPES
 Certificat d'aptitude au professorat de l'enseignement du second degré, a diploma in France
 Coordenadoria de Aperfeiçoamento de Pessoal de Nível Superior, a major research funding agency in Brazil

Other uses
 Capes Lake, British Columbia, Canada
 The Capes region, Western Australia
 The Capes, an indie rock band from South London

See also
 Cape (disambiguation)
 Kapes, 9th century BC wife of Pharaoh Takelot I
 Kapes (genus), an extinct genus of parareptiles